The Scripps Institution of Oceanography (sometimes referred to as SIO, Scripps Oceanography, or Scripps) in San Diego, California, US founded in 1903, is one of the oldest and largest centers for ocean and Earth science research, public service, undergraduate and graduate training in the world. Hundreds of ocean and Earth scientists conduct research with the aid of oceanographic research vessels and shorebased laboratories. Its Old Scripps Building is a U.S. National Historic Landmark. SIO is a division of the University of California San Diego (UCSD).  The public explorations center of the institution is the Birch Aquarium at Scripps.  Since becoming part of the University of California in 1912, the institution has expanded its scope to include studies of the physics, chemistry, geology, biology, and climate of Earth.

Margaret Leinen took office as Vice Chancellor for Marine Sciences, Director of Scripps Institution of Oceanography, and Dean of the Graduate School of Marine Sciences on October 1, 2013.

Scripps publishes explorations now, an e-magazine of ocean and earth science.

History 
Scripps Institution of Oceanography was founded in 1903 as the Marine Biological Association of San Diego, an independent biological research laboratory. It was proposed and incorporated by a committee of the San Diego Chamber of Commerce, led by local activist and amateur malacologist Fred Baker, together with two colleagues. He recruited University of California Zoology professor William Emerson Ritter to head up the proposed marine biology institution, and obtained financial support from local philanthropists E. W. Scripps and Ellen Browning Scripps. They fully funded the institution for its first decade. It began institutional life in the boathouse of the Hotel del Coronado located on San Diego Bay. It re-located in 1905 to the La Jolla area on the head above La Jolla Cove, and finally in 1907 to its present location.

In 1912 Scripps became incorporated into the University of California and was renamed the "Scripps Institution for Biological Research." Since 1916, measurements have been taken daily at its pier. The name was changed to Scripps Institution of Oceanography in October 1925. During the 1960s, led by Scripps Institution of Oceanography director Roger Revelle, it formed the nucleus for the creation of the University of California, San Diego on a bluff overlooking Scripps Institution.

The Old Scripps Building, designed by Irving Gill, was declared a National Historic Landmark in 1982. Architect Barton Myers designed the current Scripps Building for the Institution of Oceanography in 1998.

Research programs 
The institution's research programs encompass biological, physical, chemical, geological, and geophysical studies of the oceans and land. Scripps also studies the interaction of the oceans with both the atmospheric climate and environmental concerns on terra firma. Related to this research, Scripps offers undergraduate and graduate degrees.

Today, the Scripps staff of 1,300 includes approximately 235 faculty, 180 other scientists and some 350 graduate students, with an annual budget of more than $281 million. The institution operates a fleet of four oceanographic research vessels.

The Integrated Research Themes  encompassing the work done by Scripps researchers are Biodiversity and Conservation, California Environment, Earth and Planetary Chemistry, Earth Through Space and Time, Energy and the Environment, Environment and Human Health, Global Change, Global Environmental Monitoring, Hazards, Ice and Climate, Instruments and Innovation, Interfaces, Marine Life, Modeling Theory and Computing, Sound and Light and the Sea, and Waves and Circulation.

Organizational structure 
Scripps Oceanography is divided into three research sections, each with its own subdivisions:
 Biology
 Center for Marine Biotechnology & Biomedicine (CMBB)
 Integrative Oceanography Division (IOD) 
 Marine Biology Research Division (MBRD)
 Earth
 Cecil H. and Ida M. Green Institute of Geophysics and Planetary Physics (IGPP)
 Geosciences Research Division (GRD)
 Oceans & Atmosphere
 Climate, Atmospheric Science & Physical Oceanography (CASPO)
 Marine Physical Laboratory (MPL)

California Sea Grant 
On October 25, 1973, California Sea Grant became a college (National Sea Grant College Program) administered by Scripps Institution of Oceanography at the University of California, San Diego.

Research vessels 

Scripps owns and operates several research vessels and platforms:
 RV Roger Revelle
 RV Sally Ride
 RV Robert Gordon Sproul
 RP Flip
 RV Bob and Betty Beyster
Current and previous vessels larger than  
 1906–???? – RV Loma
 1907–1917 – RV Alexander Agassiz
 1918–1918 – RV Ellen Browning
 1925–1936 – RV Scripps
 1937–1955 – RV E. W. Scripps
 1955–1965 – RV Stranger (Operated as USS Jasper from 1941 to 1947 for the UC Division of War Research)
 1947–1956 – RV Crest
 1947–1969 – RV Horizon
 1948–1965 – RV Paolina-T
 1951–1965 – RV Spencer F.Baird
 1955–1969 – T-441
 1956–1962 – RV Orca
 1959–1963 – RV Hugh M. Smith
 1959–1970 – RV Argo (Official Navy name was Snatch)
 1962–1976 – RV Alexander Agassiz
 1962–present – RP FLIP
 1962–1974 – RV Oconostota (The Oconostota was known as "The Rolling O" because of its unpleasant motion.)
 1965–1980 – RV Alpha Helix (Transferred to University of Alaska, Fairbanks in 1980 (UAF sold vessel in 2007 to Stabbert Maritime)
 1965–???? – RV Ellen B. Scripps
 1966–1992 – RV Thomas Washington (Transferred to Chile and renamed Vidal Gormaz)
 1969–2014 – RV Melville
 1973–???? – RV Gianna
 1978–2015 – RV New Horizon
 1984–present – RV Robert Gordon Sproul
 1995–present – RV Roger Revelle
 2016–present – RV Sally Ride
 2019–present - RV Bob and Betty Beyster

Birch Aquarium at Scripps 

Birch Aquarium at Scripps, the public exploration center for the institution, features a Hall of Fishes with more than 60 tanks of Pacific fishes and invertebrates from the cold waters of the Pacific Northwest to the tropical waters of Mexico and the IndoPacific, a 13,000-gallon local shark and ray exhibit, interactive tide pools, and interactive science exhibits.

Notable faculty members (past and present) 

Farooq Azam
George Backus
Ernest Baldwin
Andrew Benson
Hugh Bradner
Edward Brinton
Theodore Holmes Bullock
Ralph J. Cicerone
Robert W. Corell
Harmon Craig
Paul J. Crutzen
Russ E. Davis
Paul K. Dayton
Edward DeLong
Robert S. Dietz
Seibert Q. Duntley
Carl Eckart
Jim T. Enright
David Epel
Edward A. Frieman
Robert Garrels
Freeman Gilbert
Edward D. Goldberg
Klaus Hasselmann
Joel Hedgpeth
Walter Heiligenberg
Myrl C. Hendershott
Sam Hinton
Carl Hubbs
Douglas Inman
John Dove Isaacs
Jeremy Jackson
Martin W. Johnson
Thomas H. Jordan
Miriam Kastner
Charles David Keeling
Ralph Keeling
Charles Kennel
Nancy Knowlton
Lisa Levin
Ralph A. Lewin
Michael S. Longuet-Higgins
Edwin P. Martz
Wallace K. (Ken) Melville
Henry William Menard
Mario J. Molina
John W. Miles
B. Greg Mitchell
Judith Munk
Walter Munk
Jerome Namias
William Nierenberg
Pearn P. Niiler
Stewart Nozette
Veerabhadran Ramanathan
Roger Revelle
William Emerson Ritter
Dean Roemmich
Richard Heinrich Rosenblatt
Enric Sala
Rick Salmon
Hans Suess
Francis Parker Shepard
Cornelius Cole Smith, Jr.
Richard Somerville
Fred Spiess
Janet Sprintall
George Sugihara
Harald Sverdrup
Lynne Talley
Warren White
Klaus Wyrtki
Victor Vacquier Sr. and son
Benjamin Elazari Volcani
Lihini Aluwihare

Notable alumni 
 
Tanya Atwater
Thomas E. Bowman III
Edward Brinton
Stephen E. Calvert
Kim Cobb
Jack Corliss
John M. Edmond
Kenneth Farley
Michael Freilich
Susan M. Gaines
Timothy Gallaudet
Eric Giddens
Susan Hough
Ancel Keys
Megan McArthur
James J. McCarthy
Marcia McNutt
Jessica Meir
Walter Munk
Wheeler J. North
Giuseppe Notarbartolo di Sciara
Colm Ó hEocha
Joseph R. Pawlik
George Perry
S. K. Satheesh
Brinke Stevens
Christopher Stott
Brian Tucker

Popular culture 
In 2014, the institution and its Keeling Curve measurement of atmospheric carbon dioxide levels were featured as a plot point in an episode of HBO's The Newsroom.
In 2008, Scripps Institution of Oceanography was the subject of a category on the TV game show Jeopardy!. Scripps has been a story element in numerous fictional works.

See also 

 Array Network Facility
 RISE project
 The Scripps Research Institute, a neighboring, but completely independent medical research institute
 Monterey Bay Aquarium Research Institute, a private, non-profit oceanographic research center in Moss Landing, California
 Moss Landing Marine Laboratories, a multi-campus marine research consortium of the California State University System
 Hopkins Marine Station, a similar research facility run by Stanford University in Monterey, California
 Hatfield Marine Science Center, a similar research facility associated with the Oregon State University and located in Newport, Oregon
 Woods Hole Oceanographic Institution, a similar research facility located in Woods Hole, Massachusetts

References

Further reading 
 Scripps Institution of Oceanography; First Fifty Years Helen Raitt and Beatrice Moulton. Los Angeles : W. Ritchie Press, 1967.
Scripps Institution of Oceanography : Probing the Oceans, 1936 to 1976 Elizabeth Noble Shor. San Diego, Calif. : Tofua Press, 1978.
The Keeling Curve Turns 50

External links 
Scripps Institution of Oceanography
explorations E-Magazine
Support Scripps
Birch Aquarium at Scripps
"How Scripps Institution Came To San Diego", The Journal of San Diego History 27:3 (Summer 1981) by Elizabeth N. Shor
Scripps Institution of Oceanography digital collection on HathiTrust Digital Library

 
Oceanographic organizations
University of California, San Diego
La Jolla, San Diego
Organizations based in San Diego
Universities and colleges in San Diego
National Register of Historic Places in San Diego
Scripps family
Barton Myers buildings
1903 establishments in California